Argentine Uruguayans are people born in Argentina who live in Uruguay. In 2010, there were over 10,000 Argentines living in Uruguayan territory.

Overview
Many Argentine-born persons reside in Uruguay, for a number of reasons. Both countries share the same language, culture and ethnicity and their populations bear striking similarities; the historical origins of both nations is common (part of the Viceroyalty of the River Plate, Spanish Empire); both countries are members of MERCOSUR, there is no need for special migration documents, and circulation is relatively easy. Uruguay is a small, quiet country, with wide beaches on the Atlantic Ocean, so many Argentines choose Uruguay as their usual holiday destination, some of them even as permanent residence; Argentine people come to Uruguay in search of a better quality of life. The Uruguayan resort Punta del Este is famous as "the biggest Argentine seaside resort".

The 2011 Uruguayan census revealed 26,782 people who declared Argentina as their country of birth. In 2013, there were almost 6,000 Argentine citizens registered in the Uruguayan social security.

Argentines in Uruguay have their own institutions, such as the Uruguayan-Argentine Institute, a bilingual school in Punta del Este.

In 2022, It was confirmed Colonia was going to make a Silicon Valley in Colonia called 'Colonia Ala Este' to bring more Argentine immigrants due to the bad economy in Argentina doubling their population making their goal reach to about 60,000 people in total in Colonia. With an initial investment of more than US$ 100 million, it was planned to build a sustainable city open to the community to generate a hub for the knowledge economy industry on a 500-hectare site, which includes forests and seven kilometers of coastline. with beaches such as Calabrés and Fernando.

Notable people
past
Torcuato de Alvear (1822-1890), politician, son and father of presidents of Argentina
Virginia Bolten (1870-1960), activist
Manuel Arturo Claps (1920-1999), writer, member of the Generation of 45
Esteban Echeverría (1805-1851), poet, writer, and political activist
Matilde Ibáñez Tálice (1907-2002), First Lady of Uruguay as wife of President Luis Batlle Berres, and mother of President Jorge Batlle Ibáñez
Tristán Narvaja (1819-1877), legal scholar, compiler of the Uruguayan Civil Code
José Rondeau (1773-1844), general, Provisional Governor and Captain General of Uruguay (1828)
Alberto Zum Felde (1887-1976), historian, essayist and critic
present
Thelma Biral, actress, studied with Margarita Xirgu and started her theatre career in Montevideo
Julio Bocca, ballet dancer, current director of SODRE National Ballet
Martín Bonjour, footballer
Emiliano Brancciari, musician
Roberto Reinaldo Cáceres González, bishop emeritus of Melo
Gustavo Cordera, musician, frontman of the band Bersuit Vergarabat
Cacho de la Cruz, television presenter
Carlos María Domínguez, journalist
Marcos Galperin, businessman, founder and CEO of MercadoLibre
Macarena Gelman, politician, granddaughter of poet Juan Gelman
Gabriel Migliónico, footballer
Mónica Navarro, singer and actress
Daniel Pereira, footballer

See also
Argentina–Uruguay relations
Uruguayans in Argentina

References

Immigration to Uruguay
Ethnic groups in Uruguay
 
Uruguay